Burtonview is an unincorporated community in Logan County, along Illinois Route 10 in Central Illinois. The community lies between Lincoln and New Holland on Route 10.

History
Burtonview was originally called Burton, and under the latter name had its start when the Champaign, Lincoln and Eastern Railroad was extended to that point. A post office called Burton View was established in 1873, and remained in operation until 1918.

References

External links
Burtonview on Google Maps 

Unincorporated communities in Logan County, Illinois
Unincorporated communities in Illinois